Semachrysa is a genus of green lacewing found from Japan to Australia along the Western part of the Pacific Ocean. 20 Semachrysa species have been described between 1914 and 2012. 15 of them - one of which was new - have been included in a recent taxonomic study:
Semachrysa claggi (Banks, 1937)
Semachrysa contorta Brooks, 1983
Semachrysa cruciata (Esben-Petersen, 1928)
Semachrysa dammermanni (Esben-Petersen, 1929)
Semachrysa decorata (Esben-Petersen, 1913)
Semachrysa hyndi Brooks, 1983
Semachrysa jade Winterton & Guek & Brooks, 2012
Semachrysa matsumurae (Okamoto, 1914)
Semachrysa minuta Brooks, 1983
Semachrysa nigribasis (Banks, 1920)
Semachrysa papuensis Brooks, 1983
Semachrysa picilabris (Kimmins, 1952)
Semachrysa polysticta Brooks, 1983
Semachrysa sagitta Brooks, 1983
Semachrysa wallacei Brooks, 1983

Further members include:
Semachrysa guangxiensis Yang & Yang, 1991
Semachrysa phanera (Yang, 1987)
Semachrysa polystricta Yang & Wang, 1994
Semachrysa pulchella Tsukaguchi, 1995
Semachrysa yananica Yang & Yang, 1989

References

Chrysopidae
Neuroptera genera